Edward Gale Stevens Jr. (August 15, 1941 – July 10, 2020), known professionally as Eddie Gale, was an American trumpeter known for his work in free jazz, especially with the Sun Ra Arkestra.

Life and career
Born in Brooklyn, New York, Gale studied trumpet with Kenny Dorham.  He recorded with Cecil Taylor, Sun Ra, Larry Young, and Elvin Jones, and performed with John Coltrane, Jackie McLean, Booker Ervin, and Illinois Jacquet. In the early 1960s he was introduced to Sun Ra by drummer Scoby Stroman. He spent many hours exposed to Sun Ra's philosophy about music and life. Eddie explains, "Playing with Sun Ra is a great experience--from the known to the unknown. You play ideas on your instrument that you never imagine. His music provoked me to explore the use of trills, for instance, and the placement of whole tones and then a space chord--ideas you do not find in the exercise books."

During the 1960s and 1970s, he toured and recorded extensively with Sun Ra, who influenced him greatly until Ra's death in 1993. After a yearlong stint as artist in residence at Stanford University, Gale moved to San Jose, California in 1972.

Helping to bring jazz into the 21st century, the trumpeter made numerous appearances with Oakland hip-hop outfit The Coup, whereby Gale's trumpet could be heard engaging with the music's breakbeats and turntables.

Gale died on July 10, 2020, aged 78.

Discography

As leader
1968: Ghetto Music (Blue Note)
1969: Black Rhythm Happening (Blue Note)
1992: A Minute with Miles
2004: Afro Fire
2007: Joint Happening w/Mushroom (Hyena Records)
2007: In Love Again

As sideman
With Sun Ra
Lanquidity (Saturn, 1978)
With Cecil Taylor
Unit Structures (Blue Note, 1966)
With Larry Young
Of Love and Peace (Blue Note, 1969)

References

External links
Eddie Gale official site
Eddie Gale photo by John Spragens, Jr.
 

Post-bop trumpeters
Free jazz trumpeters
Free funk trumpeters
American jazz trumpeters
American male trumpeters
Musicians from San Jose, California
1941 births
2020 deaths
Blue Note Records artists
Sun Ra Arkestra members
Avant-garde jazz trumpeters
Musicians from Brooklyn
Jazz musicians from New York (state)
American male jazz musicians
Mapleshade Records artists